Schloss Leonberg was founded in 1248 by count Ulrich I of Württemberg. The original castle was modified between 1560 and 1565 by the master builder Aberlin Tretsch by order of the duke Christoph.